The Kayin State Democracy and Development Party (KSDDP) is a political party in Myanmar.

History
The party was established in 2010. In the November 2010 general elections it won one seat in the House of Nationalities.

References

Political parties in Myanmar
Political parties established in 2010
2010 establishments in Myanmar